The Yorkshire Air Museum & Allied Air Forces Memorial is an aviation museum in Elvington, York on the site of the former RAF Elvington airfield, a Second World War RAF Bomber Command station.  The museum was founded, and first opened to the public, in the mid 1980s.

The museum is one of the largest independent air museums in Britain. It is also the only Allied Air Forces Memorial in Europe. The museum is an accredited museum under Arts Council accreditation scheme.  It is a Member of Friends of the Few (Battle of Britain Memorial), the Royal Aeronautical Society, the Museums Association and the Association of Independent Museums. 

The Museum is a registered charity  (No. 516766) dedicated to the history of aviation and was also set up as a Memorial to all allied air forces personnel, particularly those who served in the Royal Air Force during the Second World War.

Site

The  parkland site includes buildings and hangars, some of which are listed. It incorporates a  managed environment area and a DEFRA and Environment Agency supported self sustainability project called "Nature of Flight". The museum is situated next to a 10,000 ft runway, which is privately owned.

History
Whilst the Royal Air Force carried on using the runway for aircraft landing and take off training until 1992, the buildings and hangars had long been abandoned. In 1980 Rachel Semlyen approached the owners of "what was then an abandoned and derelict wartime site, with the idea of restoring the buildings and creating a museum". In 1983, a group started clearing the undergrowth and the site was ready to be unveiled as the Yorkshire Air Museum in 1986.

Events
The Museum undertakes several annual events each year within the general attraction / entertainment area as well as educational / academic events for specific audiences, plus several corporate events in association with companies such as Bentley, Porsche, banking, government agencies etc. The unique annual Allied Air Forces Memorial Day takes place in September.

Exhibits
The Museum has 49 aircraft spanning the development of aviation from 1853 up to the latest GR4 Tornado. Several aircraft including Victor, Nimrod, Buccaneer, Sea Devon, SE5a, Eastchurch Kitten, DC3 Dakota are kept live and operated on special "Thunder Days" during the year. Over 20 historic vehicles and a Registered Archive containing over 500,000 historic artefacts and documents are also preserved at the Museum, which is also the Official Archive for the National Aircrew Association and National Air Gunners Association. It is nationally registered and accredited through DCMS/Arts Council England and is a registered charity.

A permanent exhibition on RAF Bomber Command was opened at the museum by life member, Sir David Jason. In 2010 a new exhibition called "Pioneers of Aviation", and funded by the Heritage Lottery Fund, was opened featuring the lives and achievements of Sir George Cayley, Sir Barnes Wallis, Robert Blackburn, Nevil Shute and Amy Johnson.

Principal on-site businesses include: Restaurant, Retail Shop, Events, Aircraft Operation Engineering Workshops, Archives and Corporate Business Suite. The museum is also a location for TV and film companies.

 Building 1 – Airborne Forces Display & No. 609 Squadron RAF Room
 Building 2 – Uniform Display
 Building 3 – Air Gunners' Exhibition
 Building 4 – Archives & Reference Library
 Building 5 – Museum Shop
 Building 7 – Memorial Garden
 Building 8 – Museum HQ, Main Entrance
 Building 9 – Against the Odds
 Building 10 – Elvington Corporate Room
 Building 11 – Museum NAAFI Restaurant
 Building 12 – Control Tower
 Building 13 – French Officers' Mess
 Building 14 – Airmens Billet and Station MT Display
 Building 15 – Royal Observer Corp
 Building 16 – Signal Square
 Building 17 – Hangar T2 Main Aircraft exhibition
 Building 18 – Archive & Collections Building
 Building 19 – Handley Page Aircraft Workshop
 Building 20 – Pioneer of Aviation Exhibition

Collection

Aircraft on display

Pre-World War II

 Avro 504K – Replica
 Blackburn Mercury – Replica
 Cayley Glider – Replica
 Mignet HM.14 Pou-du-Ciel
 Port Victoria P.V.8 Eastchurch Kitten Replica
 Royal Aircraft Factory BE.2c – Replica
 Royal Aircraft Factory SE.5a – Replica
 Wright Flyer – Replica

World War II

 Avro Anson T.21 VV901
 Douglas Dakota IV KN353
 Fairchild Argus II FK338
 Gloster Meteor F.8 WL168
 Gloster Meteor NF.14 WS788
 Handley Page Halifax III LV907
 Hawker Hurricane I – Replica
 Messerschmitt Bf 109 G-6 – Replica
 Slingsby T.7 Kirby Cadet RA854
 Supermarine Spitfire I – Replica
 Waco Hadrian 237123

Post World War II

 Air Command Commander Elite
 Beagle Terrier 2 TJ704
 Canadair CT-133 Silver Star 133417
 de Havilland Devon C.2 VP967
 de Havilland Vampire T.11 XH278
 Europa Prototype 001
 Mainair Demon
 Saunders-Roe Skeeter AOP.12 XM553
 Westland Dragonfly HR.5 WH991

Cold War

 BAC Jet Provost T.4 XP640
 Blackburn Buccaneer S.2 XN974
 Blackburn Buccaneer S.2B XX901
 British Aerospace Harrier GR.3 XV748
 British Aerospace Nimrod MR.2 XV250
 Dassault Mirage IIIE 538
 Dassault Mirage IVA 45/BR
 English Electric Canberra T.4 WH846
 English Electric Lightning F.6 XS903
 Fairey Gannet AEW.3 XL502
 Gloster Javelin FAW.9 XH767
 Handley Page Victor K.2 XL231
 Hawker Hunter FGA.78 QA10
 Hawker Hunter T.7 XL572
 Panavia Tornado GR.1 ZA354
 Panavia Tornado GR.4 XZ631

Ground vehicles

Second World War

 Thompson Brothers Aircraft Refueller
 1938 Ford Model E
 1940 "Tilly" Standard 12 hp Mkl RAF Utility Vehicle
 1941 Chevrolet 4x4 CMP
 1942 Austin K2 NAAFI Wagon
 1942 Thornycroft ‘Amazon’ Coles Crane

Cold War

 1947 Commer one and a half deck airport coach
 1949 Citroen 11BL
 1948 David Brown VIG.2 Aircraft Tractor
 1949 David Brown VIG.3 Aircraft Tractor
 1951 David Brown GP Airfield Tractor
 1953 Alvis Saracen 12ton APC
 1953 Austin Champ Cargo 4x4 General Purpose Vehicle
 1956 Green Goddess Self Propelled Pump
 1958 Commer Q4 Bikini Fire Pump Unit
 1958 Lansing Aircraft Carrier Type Tug
 1959 Daimler Ferret ASC MK.2/3/7
 1966 Chieftain Main Battle Tank
 1970 Douglas P3 nuclear aircraft 25 tonne tug
 1971 Pathfinder Fire Engine 35ton (ex. Manchester Airport)
 1972 TACR2 Range Rover - 6 wheeled fast response fire unit
 1974 GMC 6 wheeled fast response airfield fire truck
 1976 Dennis Mercury 17.5 tonne aircraft tug
 Pathfinder Fire Engine

References

External links 

 Yorkshire Air Museum

Aerospace museums in England
Museums in York
Museums established in 1986
World War II museums in the United Kingdom
Military aviation museums in England
1986 establishments in England